Amethysa is a genus of ulidiid or picture-winged fly in the family Ulidiidae.

Species
Amethysa basalis
Amethysa calligyna
Amethysa fasciata
Amethysa intermedia
Amethysa macquarti

References